Route 401, also known as Howley Road, is a  minor highway in the western region of Newfoundland in the Canadian province of Newfoundland and Labrador. The highway begins at a junction with the Trans-Canada Highway (Route 1) and continues to its southern terminus, the community of Howley. There are no other major intersections or communities along the entire length of Route 401. As with most highways in Newfoundland and Labrador, Route 401 is a two-lane highway in its entirety.

Major intersections

References

401